Events in the year 1958 in Turkey.

Parliament
 11th Parliament of Turkey

Incumbents
President – Celal Bayar
Prime Minister – Adnan Menderes
Leader of the opposition – İsmet İnönü

Ruling party and the main opposition
  Ruling party – Democrat Party (DP) 
  Main opposition – Republican People's Party (CHP)

Cabinet
23rd government of Turkey

Events
 16 January – Nine army officers arrested for plotting against the government.
1 March – Commuter boat Üsküdar sinks. Most of the passengers were students.
2 June – Publication ban on the statements made by İsmet İnönü, the opposition leader
7 June – Series of public demonstrations concerning Cyprus dispute begin.
20 July – Partial mobilization after the revolution in Iraq

Deaths
3 January – Cafer Tayyar Eğilmez (born in 1877), former general
25 January – Cemil Topuzlu (born in 1868), one of the pioneers of modern medicine
10 February – Nezihe Muhiddin, female activist, journalist
28 February – Zeki Üngör (born in 1880), musician
15 July – Cemil Cahit Toydemir (born in 1883), former government minister (15th government of Turkey)
1 November – Yahya Kemal Beyatlı (born in 1884), poet

Births
9 January – Mehmet Ali Ağca, assassin  
16 January – Ayşenur İslam, government minister
1 April – Banu Alkan, actress
6 May – Haluk Ulusoy, the former president of Turkish Football Federation
9 August – Muazzez Ersoy (Hatice Yıldız Levent), singer
11 September- Altan Tan, writer

Gallery

References

 
Years of the 20th century in Turkey
Turkey
Turkey
Turkey